Obergum is part of the town Winsum (Groningen, Netherlands) that lies north of the Winsumerdiep. Originally it was a separate village. Winsum and Obergum have been connected since 1808 by the bridge De Boog (The Arch).

The village is built around a wierde (hill) on which a 13th-century Romanesque church stands, called the St. Nicholas Chapel.

References

External links 

Populated places in Groningen (province)
Het Hogeland